"The Hi De Ho Man" is a song by Cab Calloway. The chorus has been seen in "Minnie the Moocher".

In late 2017, the intro of the song was sampled for "Icon", from American rapper Jaden Smith's album Syre.

References

Cab Calloway songs